Gelles is a surname. Notable people with the surname include:

 Michael Gelles, American forensic psychologist
 Richard Gelles (1946–2020), American writer and sociologist

See also
 Geller